The Incredulity of Saint Thomas is an oil painting on canvas of 1640–1649 by Matthias Stom in the Museo del Prado, Madrid. Another version of the subject by the same artist is in the Baron Scotti collection in Bergamo; both were produced during the artist's time on Sicily.

The work first appeared in the written record as one of the paintings listed as saved from the 1734 fire at the Royal Alcázar of Madrid; at that time it was thought to be a copy of an original by Guercino. Another inventory of 1772, this time of the Royal Palace in Madrid, re-attributed it as an autograph work by Stom's teacher Gerard van Honthorst. This misattribution which survived until 1963, when the work was reassigned to Hendrick ter Brugghen. Arthur von Schneider first suggested Stom as the work's artist and many years later, in 1985, a catalogue finally restored this attribution.

References

1640s paintings
Paintings by Matthias Stom
Paintings depicting Jesus
Paintings depicting Thomas the Apostle
Paintings of the Museo del Prado by Dutch artists